Gennady Anatolyevich Vetrov (born November 18, 1958) is a Soviet and Russian satirist and humorist, singer, Honored Artist of Russia (August 9, 2009).

Biography 
Gennady Vetrov was born on November 18, 1958, in Makiyivka (Donetsk Oblast) in the family of a former coal miner who became a hairdresser. He has graduated from Makiivka Civil Engineering Institute.

In 1988 he graduated from the acting and directing course in LGITMiK. He has worked in the theater "Buff", toured the United States, Switzerland, Germany and France. Worked for several years in Germany. In 1992 he gave 33 recitals in the United States. Member of television programs "Shire Krug", "Full House", "Piano in the bush", "Fun". Gennady Vetrov lead television programs "Piano in the bush", "Shire Krug", "Funny People".

The founder and leader of the pop group "Vetrov's people" (in Russian it sounds like "Windy people").

Personal life 
First wife —  businesswoman Anastasia Smolina (involved in the organization of holidays).
 A daughter   — actress Ksenia Vetrova (born August 5, 1993).
 Second wife  — actress Karina Zvereva (to 2011).
 Third wife  — stewardess Oksana Voronicheva from Arkhangelsk. 
 A daughter  —  Mary Vetrova (1 June 2016).

Filmography

References

External links

Living people
Russian male film actors
Russian male comedians
Russian satirists
1958 births
Honored Artists of the Russian Federation
Russian parodists
Russian State Institute of Performing Arts alumni